Philibert de Chalon (18 March 1502 – 3 August 1530) was the last Prince of Orange from the House of Chalon.

Biography
Born at Nozeroy to John IV of Chalon-Arlay, Philibert served Emperor Charles V as commander in Italy, fighting in the War of the League of Cognac. He took part in the Sack of Rome and was killed during the final stages of the Siege of Florence (1530). An interesting exchange of letters during the siege between him and Charles still survives.

He died in 1530 being the last legitimate male line descendant of the ancient house of Ivrea (Anscarids), he was succeeded as Prince of Orange by the son of his sister (Claudia of Chalon), Renatus of Nassau-Breda, who thus founded the House of Orange-Nassau.

Ancestors

References

Sources

Sources
The Prince of Orange in Medieval History of Navarre

1502 births
1530 deaths
People from Jura (department)
Chalon-Arlay
Princes of Orange
Knights of the Golden Fleece
Military leaders of the Italian Wars
Military personnel killed in action
Viceroys of Naples
Philibert of Chalon
16th-century French people